The Golden Reel Award for Outstanding Achievement in Sound Editing - Sound Effects, Foley, Dialogue and ADR for Feature Documentary is an annual award given by the Motion Picture Sound Editors. It honors sound editors whose work has warranted merit in the field of cinema; in this case, their work in the field of documentary films. It was first awarded in 2010.

Winners and nominees

2010s
 Best Sound Editing - Sound Effects, Foley, Dialogue, ADR and Music in a Feature Documentary

2020s

References

External links
Official MPSE Website

Golden Reel Awards (Motion Picture Sound Editors)